The American University of Beirut (AUB) is a private, non-sectarian, and independent university chartered in New York with its campus in Beirut, Lebanon. AUB is governed by a private, autonomous board of trustees and offers programs leading to bachelor's, master's, MD, and PhD degrees.

AUB has an operating budget of $423 million with an endowment of approximately $768 million. The campus is composed of 64 buildings, including the American University of Beirut Medical Center (AUBMC, formerly known as AUH – American University Hospital) (420 beds), four libraries, three museums and seven dormitories. Almost one-fifth of AUB's students attended secondary school or university outside Lebanon before coming to AUB. AUB graduates reside in more than 120 countries worldwide. The language of instruction is English. Degrees awarded at the university are officially registered with the New York Board of Regents.

History

On January 23, 1862, W. M. Thomson proposed to a meeting of the American Board of Commissioners for Foreign Missions that a college of higher learning, that would include medical training, should be established in Beirut with Dr. Daniel Bliss as its president. On April 24, 1863, while Bliss was raising money for the new college in the United States and England, the State of New York granted a charter for the Syrian Protestant College. The college, which was renamed the American University of Beirut in 1920, opened with a class of 16 students on December 3, 1866. Bliss served as its first president, from 1866 until 1902. In the beginning Arabic was used as the language of instruction because it was the common language of the ethnic groups of the region, and prospective students needed to be fluent in Ottoman Turkish or in French as well as in English. In 1887 the language of instruction became English.

AUB alumni have had a broad and significant impact on the region and the world for many years. For example, 20 AUB alumni were delegates to the signing of the United Nations Charter in 1945—more than any other university in the world. AUB graduates continue to serve in leadership positions as presidents of their countries, prime ministers, members of parliament, ambassadors, governors of central banks, presidents and deans of colleges and universities, academics, business people, scientists, engineers, doctors, teachers, and nurses. They work in governments, the private sector, and in nongovernmental organizations.

During the Lebanese Civil War (1975–1990) AUB pursued various means to preserve the continuity of studies, including enrollment agreements with universities in the United States. In 1982 acting president David S. Dodge was kidnapped on campus by pro-Iranian Shiite Muslim extremists. On January 18, 1984, AUB President Malcolm H. Kerr was murdered outside his office by members of Islamic Jihad, which preceded the Hezbollah. In 1984 and 1985 a number of university staff were kidnapped, including electrical engineering professor Frank Regier, professor J. Leigh Douglas, professor Philip Padfield, professor Joseph Cicippio, dean of the faculty of Agricultural and Food Sciences Thomas Sutherland (held captive from 1985 to 1991), director David Jacobsen, and librarian Peter Kilburn (killed by his captors). In all, 30 university-connected people were kidnapped during the war.

On 8 November 1991 a car-bomb demolished the main administrative building, killing one member of staff. The New York Times reported that it was believed to have been set off by pro-Iranian Muslim fundamentalists. Another source states that Hassan Abd al-Nabih, a senior intelligence officer in the South Lebanon Army was accused of being responsible.

After initially announcing that it would stay open in the face of the COVID-19 pandemic, and ignoring the Lebanese Ministry of Education and Higher Education's request that it shut down, in early March 2020 the university announced that it would close down. AUB later announced the creation of an expert committee. A research portal was also created to help in studying COVID-19 pandemic related issues.

On May 5, 2020, AUB's President Fadlo Khuri announced a projected 60% decline in AUB's revenue in the next academic year and added that furloughs, layoffs, and the elimination of departments and programs will be necessary for financial survival. Initially, Khuri announced that AUB would "fire 22–25%" of its staff due to severe financial difficulties; in July, the university cut 850 jobs, including 650 staff layoffs and a further 200 employees not having their contracts renewed or taking retirement and not being replaced.

Later that same year, in December, AUB adjusted the LBP-USD exchange rate at which its dollar-pegged tuition was charged, from an official rate of £L1,515 to the dollar to a £L3,900 rate used by banks for electronic transactions. This was interpreted by some as a 160% increase in tuition fees. Although the university announced significant increases in financial aid, some students protested the administration's decision and were blocked from entering campus, eventually being teargassed by the Lebanese Internal Security Forces and riot police.

Presidents
The list of university presidents since its establishment:

 Daniel Bliss (1866–1902)
 Howard S. Bliss (1902–1920)
 Bayard Dodge (1923–1948)
 Stephen B.L. Penrose Jr. (1948–1954)
 Constantin Zureiq (1954–1957)
 J. Paul Leonard (1957–1961)
 Norman Burns (1961–1965)
 Samuel B. Kirkwood (1965–1976)
 Harold E. Hoelscher (1977–1981)
 Malcolm H. Kerr (1981–1984)
 Calvin Plimpton (1984–1987)
 Frederic P. Herter (1987–1993)
 Robert M. Haddad (1993–1996)
 David S. Dodge (1996–1997)
 John Waterbury (1997–2008)
 Peter F. Dorman (2008 – June 2015)
 Fadlo R. Khuri (September 2015–Present)

Campus

The  American University of Beirut campus is on a hill overlooking the Mediterranean Sea on one side and bordering Bliss Street on the other. AUB's campus in Ras Beirut consists of 64 buildings, seven dormitories and several libraries. In addition, the university also houses the Charles W. Hostler Student Center, an Archaeological Museum as well as the widely renowned Natural History Museum. Students also have a range of recreational and research facilities, such as the 247 acre research farm and educational complex hosted by the Faculty of Agricultural and Food Sciences' AREC (Advancing Research Enabling Communities Center) in Beqaa, Lebanon.

Faculties
FAFS, Faculty of Agricultural and Food Sciences
FAS, Faculty of Arts and Sciences
FHS, Faculty of Health Sciences
FM, Faculty of Medicine
HSON, Rafic Hariri School of Nursing
MSFEA, Maroun Semaan Faculty of Engineering and Architecture
OSB, Suliman S. Olayan School of Business

Students
In fall 2018, there were over 9,000 students enrolled at AUB: 7,180 undergraduates and 1,922 graduate students.

Academics

AUB offers 141 undergraduate/graduate programs and 36 certificates and diplomas. In 2007, the university reintroduced PhD programs. AUB also includes dozens of research centers and institute that sponsor and promote research in a variety of fields.

Medical Center
The AUB Medical Center (AUBMC) is the private, not-for-profit teaching center of the Faculty of Medicine. AUBMC, which is accredited by the Joint Commission International (JCIA) on hospital accreditation, includes a 420-bed hospital and offers comprehensive tertiary/quaternary medical care and referral services in a wide range of specialties and medical, nursing, and paramedical training programs at the undergraduate and post-graduate levels.

Throughout its history, the AUB Medical Center, which was formerly known as the American University Hospital (AUH), has played a critical role in caring for the victims of regional and local conflicts. It provided care for the sick and wounded during World War I and World War II, the Lebanese Civil War, and the Palestinian conflict. In recent years, it has provided care for a number of Syrian refugees at the Medical Center in Beirut, at partner hospitals, and at mobile clinics.

Since 1905, AUB's medical services have included a nursing school. In 2008, the American Association of Colleges of Nursing (AACN) invited AUB's Rafic Hariri School of Nursing to become a full member, making it the first member of the AACN outside the United States. The American Nurses Credentialing Center's (ANCC) Magnet Recognition Program awarded AUBMC its prestigious Magnet designation on June 23, 2009. AUBMC is the first healthcare institution in the Middle East and the third in the world outside the United States to receive this award.

On April 4, 2011, AUB announced the AUBMC 2020 Vision, which includes the construction of a state-of-the-art medical complex consisting of 12 buildings that would increase bed capacity to almost 600. In his inaugural address in January 2016, AUB President Fadlo R. Khuri, MD, outlined Health 2025 affirming the university's commitment to be the regional leader and a key global partner in addressing global health challenges.

AUBMC now includes the Rafic Hariri School of Nursing Building, the Pierre Abu Khater Outpatient Building, the Wassef and Souad Sawwaf Building, the Medical Administration Building, the Halim and Aida Daniel Academic and Clinical Center, and the Inpatient and Outpatient hospital buildings.

The university is also home to several Clinical and Research Centers of Excellence such as the Mamdouha El-Sayed Bobst Breast Unit, the Naef K. Basile Cancer Institute, the Abu-Haidar Neuroscience Institute, the Children's Cancer Center of Lebanon (affiliated with St. Jude Children's Research Hospital in Memphis, Tennessee), the Moufid Farra Heart and Vascular Outpatient Center, the Nehme and Therese Tohme Multiple Sclerosis Center, and the Ahmad and Jamila Bizri Neuro Outpatient Center. They address health issues endemic to the Arab region such as cancer, heart and vascular diseases, diabetes, obesity, multiple sclerosis, blood disorders, and mental illness.

As part of the AUBMC 2020 vision, AUBMC held a groundbreaking ceremony for its New Medical Center Expansion Under the Patronage of President Michel Aoun in May 2019.

University museums and collections
There are three museums at AUB: the Archaeological Museum, the Geology Museum, and the Natural History Museum.

The Archaeological Museum is the third oldest museum in the Near East. Its collection includes more than 16,000 objects and 10,000 coins and features pottery, prehistoric flint tools, bronze figurines, Phoenician and classical sculptures and bas-reliefs, Egyptian alabaster vases from Byblos, hairpins, and musical instruments. The museum has conducted excavations in Lebanon and Syria. The Society of the Friends of the AUB Museum organizes lectures, exhibits, and activities for children.

The Geology Museum includes rocks, minerals, and fossils from around the world. It is an important resource for AUB students and researchers and for students from other universities and schools in Lebanon.

The Natural History Museum houses a unique collection that represents the biodiversity of the area. It is especially well known for the Post Herbarium, which includes 63,000 specimens.

AUB's Archives and Special Collections includes important documents related to the founding of the Syrian Protestant College in 1866 and also many materials (documents, maps, photographs, etc.) of interest to scholars of Lebanon and the region including the Beirut Codex, a New Testament in Syriac, dating back to the ninth or tenth century; the E. W. Blatchford Collection (photographs of the Middle East, Europe, and North Africa taken between 1880 and 1900); and political and cultural posters dating back to the 1940s.

The American University of Beirut has embarked upon a new initiative (AUB Art Galleries and Collections) to play an active role in promoting fine and contemporary art in the region.
The very first step taken in this new direction coincided with the generous donation of Dr. Samir Saleeby to AUB. The Rose and Shaheen Saleeby Collection includes paintings by artists of different generations, ranging from Khalil Saleeby (1870–1928) and Cesar Gemayal (1898–1958) to Omar Onsi (1901–1969) and Saliba Douaihy (1912–1994). It also features works by Haidar Hamaoui (b. 1937), Chucrallah Fattouh (b. 1956), and Robert Khoury (b. 1923). The Saleeby donation is the cornerstone upon which AUB will establish a comprehensive collection of modern and contemporary art from the region.
The new initiative commenced with the launching of new art spaces located in and around AUB campus: the Rose and Shaheen Saleeby Museum in Sidani Street and the Byblos Bank Art Gallery, in Ada Dodge Hall (on campus).

Libraries

University libraries
The university libraries include:
Nami Jafet Memorial Library
Engineering and Architecture Library
Saab Medical Library serves the AUB Faculty of Medicine and Medical Center, Faculty of Health Sciences, the Rafic Hariri School of Nursing, in addition to the entire AUB campus.
Science and Agriculture Library.

The Agricultural Research and Education Center (AREC) in the Beqaa Valley also includes an annex to the Science and Agriculture Library.

The University Libraries are home to a rich collection that consists of:
 Print titles: 412,775 (books); 5,776 (periodicals)
Print volumes: 505,548 (books); 162,727 (periodicals)
Electronic titles (including open access): 1,098,491 (books); 138,430 (periodicals)
Databases (paid subscriptions): 262
Print books purchased/added: 7,243 titles / 8,380 volumes
Gift/Exchange books added: 4,136 titles / 5,048 volumes
Manuscripts: 1,373 titles / 1,408 volumes
Maps: 1,684 titles / 2,027 volumes
University archives: 940 linear feet / 2,720 archival boxes
Microform items: 11,487 titles / 33,265 volumes
Film and video titles: 3,544 titles / 4,629 volumes
Audio recordings: 456 titles / 740 volumes

Although many library resources are accessible remotely from on and off campus, the libraries themselves are equipped with e-classrooms, computer labs, and wireless connectivity. Trained and experienced library staff conduct classes and workshops throughout the year to introduce and train users to take advantage of the libraries' collections, information resources, and innovative technologies.

Newspaper 
AUB Outlook is a student newspaper circulated on campus grounds and on their website. It was established in 1949 and gained official status on July 15, 1957. by a license given to AUB under order no.113 issued by the Lebanese Minister of Information. Outlook is not affiliated politically and strives to not be biased toward any sect, religion, race, or ethnicity. It is run by students and is independent from the direct control of the university with an editorial board of at least 12 members appointed annually.

Accreditation
AUB was granted institutional accreditation in June 2004 by the Commission on Higher Education of the Middle States Association of Colleges and Schools. The university's accreditation was reaffirmed in 2009 and again in 2016 and 2019.

In September 2006, the Council on Education for Public Health (CEPH) accredited the Graduate Public Health Program in the Faculty of Health Sciences (FHS). The program was reaccredited in 2012 for seven years. The AUB Graduate Public Health Program is the first CEPH-accredited public health program outside the North American continent and the only CEPH-accredited public health program in the Arab world, Asia, and Africa.

The Commission on Collegiate Nursing Education (CCNE) accredited AUB's Rafic Hariri School of Nursing's BSN and MSN programs on October 13, 2007. The accreditation was reaffirmed in 2012.

In April 2009, the Association to Advance Collegiate Schools of Business (AACSB) accredited the Suliman S. Olayan School of Business (OSB). The accreditation was reaffirmed in 2014. AACSB is the leading international accrediting agency for undergraduate, master's, and doctoral degree programs in business administration and accounting. Less than five percent of business schools worldwide have earned AACSB International accreditation.

The Maroun Semaan Faculty of Engineering and Architecture at the American University of Beirut received accreditation for its undergraduate BE civil engineering, BE computer and communications engineering, BE in electrical and computer engineering, and BE in mechanical engineering programs from the Accreditation Board for Engineering and Technology (ABET) in 2008. The accreditation was reaffirmed in 2016. The undergraduate program in chemical engineering was accredited in 2013.

The Faculty of Agricultural and Food Sciences' undergraduate Nutrition and Dietetics Coordinated Program (NDCP) was accredited by the Accreditation Council for Education in Nutrition and Dietetics (ACEND) in 2013. It was reaccredited in 2017.

Notable alumni

AUB has 64,417 living alumni. They reside in more than 115 countries.

20 AUB graduates or former students were delegates to the signing of the United Nations Charter in San Francisco in 1945, including notable woman alumna Angela Jurdak Khoury, Lebanon's first woman diplomat. During its 150th celebration in 2016, the university identified "History Makers" – men and women who have distinguished themselves in the areas of Leading, Innovating, and Serving by their accomplishments as scholars, politicians, artists, and in many other fields as well.

The most notable woman alumna of the American University of Beirut is Angela Jurdak Khoury, who completed her undergraduate studies in 1937 and her master's degree in 1938. She is the first known woman to graduate with a master's degree from the American University of Beirut. She went on to become Lebanon's first woman diplomat and was awarded the National Order of the Cedar, Lebanon's highest ranking state award, in 1959.

Many other notable women alumni reached high positions in various fields. One of these women is Reem Acra an American University of Beirut business graduate that was awarded with the Fashion Design Department's award and Ellis Island award.
Another notable woman alumni is Zaha Hadid who studied mathematics at the American University of Beirut. In addition, she received an Honorary Degree from AUB, and one of her completed projects is the Issam Fares Institute for Public Policy and International Affairs Building which is currently present at AUB. Another honorable mention is Rula Ghani. Ms. Ghani is a former first lady of Afghanistan, and listed as the Top 100 world's most influential people by Time magazine. Moreover, Ghada El Samman is a famous female Arab writer. She received her master's degree from the American University of Beirut, and she founded her own publishing house. Another well known female AUB alumni is Karimeh Abbud. Karimeh, who was born in 1893, graduated from AUB with a degree in Arabic Literature. She is also considered to be the first female photographer in the Arab world. She received her first camera as a gift when she was 17 years old. Moreover, her work includes hundreds of photos regarding the Palestinian History. Moreover, Dr. Amal Mudallali is another honorable mention. Dr. Mudallali graduated from the American University of Beirut with a degree in political science. She is the first Lebanese female to ever become Lebanon's UN ambassador. Another notable female alumni was Edvick Jureidini Shayboub. She was an activist, educator, and journalist well known for her dedication and fight for women's rights. Human rights advocate Lina Abu Akleh is also an alumna.

See also

Alumni of the American University of Beirut
American University (disambiguation) for a list of similarly named institutions
The American University in Cairo (AUC)
American University of Sharjah (AUS)
American University of Iraq - Baghdad (AUB)
American University of Iraq - Sulaimani (AUI)
 Education in the Ottoman Empire

References

External links

Al Jazeera English documentary on the history of Beirut's American University

 
Educational institutions established in 1866
English as a global language
1866 establishments in Ottoman Syria
Lebanon–United States relations
Hospitals in Lebanon